Crocicreas is a genus of fungi in the family Helotiaceae. , the genus contains 60 accepted species.

Species

References

Bibliography
 

Helotiaceae